
Gmina Zawidz is a rural gmina (administrative district) in Sierpc County, Masovian Voivodeship, in east-central Poland.

Villages
Gmina Zawidz contains the villages and settlements of Budy Milewskie, Budy Piaseczne, Chabowo-Świniary, Gołocin, Grąbiec, Grabowo, Gutowo-Górki, Gutowo-Stradzyno, Jaworowo-Jastrzębie, Jaworowo-Kłódź, Jaworowo-Kolonia, Jaworowo-Lipa, Jeżewo, Kęsice, Kosemin, Kosmaczewo, Krajewice Duże, Krajewice Małe, Majki, Majki Duże, Majki Małe, Makomazy, Mańkowo, Milewko, Milewo, Młotkowo-Kolonia, Młotkowo-Wieś, Nowe Kowalewo, Nowe Zgagowo, Orłowo, Osiek, Osiek Piaseczny, Osiek-Parcele, Osiek-Włostybory, Ostrowy, Petrykozy, Rekowo, Schabajewo, Skoczkowo, Słupia, Stare Chabowo, Stropkowo, Szumanie, Szumanie-Pejory, Szumanie-Pustoły, Wola Grąbiecka, Żabowo, Zalesie, Zawidz, Zawidz Mały, Zgagowo-Wieś and Żytowo.

Neighbouring gminas
Gmina Zawidz is bordered by the gminas of Bielsk, Bieżuń, Drobin, Gozdowo, Raciąż, Rościszewo, Siemiątkowo and Sierpc.

References
Polish official population figures 2006

Zawidz
Sierpc County